Bartholomew Cornelius "Con" O'Brien (20 April 1866 – 11 December 1938) was an Australian politician who served as a Labor Party member of the Legislative Council of Western Australia from 1901 to 1904 and again from 1908 to 1914.

O'Brien was born in Ballarat, Victoria, and came to Western Australia in 1893, during the gold rushes. He initially lived in Derby (in the Kimberley), but in 1894 went to Cue (in the Mid West), to prospect for gold. In February 1895, he became the proprietor of the town's Great Britain Hotel, maintaining the lease until 1903. O'Brien was elected to the Cue Municipal Council in 1896, and from 1897 to 1900 served as mayor. He was elected to parliament at a 1901 Legislative Council by-election for Central Province, caused by the resignation of Frederic Whitcombe. His candidacy was supported by the Amalgamated Workers' Association (a forerunner of the Australian Workers' Union), and he subsequently joined the parliamentary Labor Party, becoming one of its first members in the Legislative Council. O'Brien lost his seat at the 1904 elections, but regained it in 1908, replacing the retiring Joseph Thomson. He left parliament in 1914, at the end of his six-year term, and returned to the hotel trade, running the Court Hotel in Perth (which he had acquired in 1906). A prominent member of the Irish community in Perth and a leader of the annual Saint Patrick's Day, he died at his hotel in December 1938, aged 72.

References

1866 births
1938 deaths
Australian Labor Party members of the Parliament of Western Australia
Australian people of Irish descent
Mayors of places in Western Australia
Members of the Western Australian Legislative Council
People from Ballarat
Western Australian local councillors